This is a list of solar eclipses in the 18th century. During the period 1701 to 1800 there were 251 solar eclipses of which 92 were partial, 78 were annular, 62 were total, and 19 were hybrids. The greatest number of eclipses in one year was four, occurring in 16 different years: 1707, 1714, 1725, 1729, 1736, 1743, 1747, 1750, 1754, 1758, 1765, 1772, 1776, 1783, 1790, and 1794. Dates are based on the Gregorian calendar.

References

18th century-related lists
+18